Olympus M.Zuiko Digital ED 300 mm f/4 IS Pro is an optically corrected telephoto lens. With its extreme focal length of 300 millimetres it is the refracting prime lens with the longest focal length of the Micro Four Thirds system (end of 2020).

Description 
M.Zuiko Digital lenses are offered as exchangeable lenses for the Micro Four Thirds system (MFT). The ED 300 mm f/4 IS Pro is available since January 2016. This lens has a focusing ring, it is water and dust proof and is equipped with an autofocus system. It is the first Olympus M.Zuiko lens to have in-built image stabilisation. Its weight is somewhat above one kilogramme, which allows easy transport and facilitates free-hand shooting.

The lens has six times normal focal length and 17 lenses in 10 groups which give a diagonal angle of view of 4.1°. The lens is made of one Super ED (Super Extra-Low Dispersion), three HR (High-Refractive index) and one E-HR (Extra-High Refractive index) elements in order to achieve good image quality and to allow a physically small construction. The ED 300 mm f/4 IS Pro has an excellent image quality with low aberration, low distortion and almost no visible vignetting.

Due to the large focal length and its toughness the lens is suitable for wildlife photography and sports photography, but it does not offer zooming such as the Panasonic Leica DG Vario-Elmar 100-400 mm. Olympus mirrorless system camera bodies have an in-body image stabilisation (IBIS) that can be combined with the lens stabilisation system via the so-called Sync IS mechanism at some models in order to achieve a better stabilising effect. This allows free-hand shots in many situations, and therefore, photographers can get rid of using a tripod.

Comparison 
Compared to other camera systems with differing normal focal lengths, and therefore different image sensor sizes, the following equivalent values apply to lenses with appropriate properties as the M.Zuiko 300 mm f/4 within the Micro-Four-Thirds system (MFT). With the parameters given in the table in all camera systems the photographer will get a similar angle of view, depth of field, diffraction limitation and motion blur:

External links 
 M.Zuiko Digital ED 300 mm 1:4 IS Pro

References 

Olympus M.Zuiko Digital lenses